Davaran (also Romanized as Dāvarān; also known as Dāviran) is a village in Darreh Doran Rural District, in the Central District of Rafsanjan County, Kerman Province, Iran. At the 2006 census, its population was 1,425, in 381 families.

References 

Populated places in Rafsanjan County